Udaloy was a  of the Russian Navy.

Development and design 

Project 1155 dates to the 1970s when it was concluded that it was too costly to build large-displacement, multi-role combatants. The concept of a specialized surface ship was developed by Soviet designers.

They are 156m in length, 17.3m in beam and 6.5m in draught.

Construction and career 
Udaloy was laid down on 23 July 1977, and launched on 5 February 1980 by Yantar Shipyard in Kaliningrad. She was commissioned on 31 December 1980.

She joined the Northern Fleet on January 24, 1981. Enlisted in the 10th brigade of anti-submarine ships of the 7th operational squadron based at Severomorsk.

Since October 26, 1983, he has been in the Atlantic Ocean. Together with Admiral Isakov, Otchayannyy and Genrikh Hasanov escorted the Novorossiysk to the latitude of Gibraltar.

March 26–30, 1984, an official visit to the island of Cuba in Havana, Cienfuegos, then completed the tasks of combat service in the Mediterranean Sea.

In the period from October 24, 1988 to January 19, 1990, it underwent a major overhaul in Kronstadt.

In December 1991, together with the Vigilant in the Strait of Gibraltar, he met and began to escort the Admiral Kuznetsov to Severomorsk. During the voyage, he established and maintained contact with 4 foreign submarines.

Due to a shortage of conscripts at the beginning of 1993, he was transferred to the 2nd category reserve.

On August 16, 1997, he was removed from the Navy.

In 2002, after partial dismantling, he sank in the Kola Bay near the village of Belokamenka. In March 2006, it was raised from the bottom by LLC Gidrotekhservice and disposed of.

References 

1980 ships
Ships built at Yantar Shipyard
Cold War destroyers of the Soviet Union
Udaloy-class destroyers